Alcuin College is a college of the University of York located on Siward's Howe in the English city of York in the county of Yorkshire.

It is one out of ten colleges of the university, being the nearest to the library on the Heslington West part of the campus.

History
Alcuin College is one of the University of York's first colleges, established in 1967 alongside Vanbrugh College. It was officially opened in 1969 by Kenneth Clark, the chancellor of the university.

It is located on Siward's Howe, making it the highest elevated college in the university. It is also believed to be the burial site of Eric Bloodaxe, who was King of Northumbria and of Norway.

Separatist movement
From the early days of the college an uproar for secession of the college from the remainder of the university has been present.

Buildings and services
For many years Alcuin College was very much the outcast on the university campus, the only college physically separate from the others except for a bridge from the library, a narrow bridge from Langwith (demolished over Easter 2008) and a walkway to the chemistry department. Overlooking University Road was Alcuin's bar. In 1995 this was transformed from a traditional British pub-style bar to a 1950s American theme bar – the only themed college bar on campus. The bar was decorated in American 1950s paraphernalia such as busts of Marilyn Monroe and a full-size pink cadillac that appeared to be crashing through the wall. The bar's terrace overlooked University Road and was immensely popular with students in the summer. The bar incorporated a burger bar and the staff all wore uniforms of stars and stripes. 

In the new century, the bar was renamed "B Henry's", after Brian Henry, a college porter of many years who had recently retired. On its opening it was very popular despite its relatively distant location compared to the rest of campus. In 2007 the bar once again went under transformation, being revamped as a "B Henry's. The Cocktail Bar". In 2008, a move by commercial services to close B Henry's triggered a large campaign to save the bar. The campaign had the backing of the whole college and the students' union as a whole, but it was unsuccessful. In 2013, the student union took over the running of the outlet and named it "The Kitchen at Alcuin". The Kitchen at Alcuin has taken to being open longer hours, now closing at 8:00 pm and having a pizza "dinner" style menu. Events such as YUSU's Keep Cool at exam time campaign, the Alcuin 50th anniversary and Envirocuin have seen the Kitchen at Alcuin being used as a more general venue for activities outside of normal opening hours.

Sometimes referred to as the "Ensuite-Elite", Alcuin is perhaps best known for the ensuite bathrooms that come as standard with every room and the general quality of the rooms, most of which were recently built. It currently does not possess a bar, but has two food venues, the Alcuin Bistro and the Kitchen at Alcuin café. The college accommodation is divided into blocks; E, F1, F2, G, H, J1, J2, K, L, M, N, P and Q. There are also several teaching blocks (East Wing and the Seebohm Rowntree building) and is home of several departments including economics and chemistry, as well as the university library.

Following Vanbrugh B and C block's conversion to offices, the uprooted residents moved to the newly made P and Q blocks (which were built on time) and referred to themselves as Valcuin members. In addition to P and Q blocks, a new JCR building was built, and an extra launderette near the JCR (to try to add to the four washing machines for the whole of Alcuin). The JCR was opened in May 2006, six months later than planned.

The Seebohm Rowntree Building was added in 2002, and contains teaching facilities.

Student association

Like the other York colleges, Alcuin has its own student association. Known as the College Student Association Committee (CSAC), the association takes on the responsibility of the day-to-day running of the college activities and is responsible for supporting students, providing social, sporting and cultural activities and developing the college community.

The 2023 CSAC executive members are:
 President - 
 Secretary - 
 Treasurer - 
 Vice-President for Events - 
 Vice-President for Wellbeing - 
 Vice-President for Sport  -

Student events 
Alcuin College is notable for hosting many popular student events. The CSAC hosts its regular pub quizzes at The Courtyard, the local campus bar. Over the past years the Alcuin CSAC have branded their events by incorporating "AL" into the title, examples include "TropicAL", "AnimAL" and "TerritoriAL". In more recent time, however, this tradition has been discarded with the coming in of newer CSACs. Popular past events include "Das Sexy Sexy German Teckno Disko Party" and its subsequent follow ups, "Das Sexy Sexy German Teckno Disko Party" parts zwei, drei, vier and fünf. Continuing with a music theme, Alcuin has introduced Alcuin Live Lounge where current and ex-students of the college attend the Kitchen at Alcuin for a chilled night of live music given by students and members of the community. Alcuin hosts a yearly winter ball, which is the most heavily attended college event of the year.

In 2022, as part of Alcuin's Freshers Week events, AnimAL was revived, being held at Courtyard.

Traditionally a spring ball was held with the last being a masquerade ball in 2017. In 2018, there was an introduction of a new Alcuin led event, "Event X". The event is to change theme each year but held on campus as an alternative to a formal in the spring term. The first Event X, "Prom", brought together not only students from Alcuin, but other colleges in Hendrix Hall with free Pic'N'Mix and a live student band.

Event X titles

 2018: Prom
 2019: TBA

Furthermore, Alcuin is also notable among the rest of the university for its wellbeing events, being able to cater for those students who do not enjoy club nights is seen to be very important and has led to recurring events such as "Exam Refuge" in which the CSAC provide free food and a relaxed environment to Alcuinites during the exam period. Alcuin is also known for hosting the "Nuzzlets" where a variety of animals are brought in for students to pet, this event has been particularly popular over the years.

Notable people
Notable alumni include:
 Peter Hitchens, author and journalist (Philosophy and Politics, 1973)
 Aníbal Cavaco Silva, former President and Prime Minister of Portugal (Doctorate in Economics, 1973)
 Steve Richards, television presenter and journalist: (History, 1981)
 Bryan Elsley, television writer (English and history, 1982)
 Paul Mealor, composer (Music, 1997)
 Hector Janse van Rensburg, artist
 Mark Laity, NATO spokesman and former BBC correspondent

References

External links

Alcuin CSAC
Alcuin College - University pages

Colleges of the University of York
1967 establishments in England
Educational institutions established in 1967